Reda Benbaziz (born 9 September 1993) is an Algerian boxer. He competed in the men's lightweight event at the 2016 Summer Olympics. On December 2nd, 2022 Reda had his professional debut at the Centre 200 arena in Sydney, Nova Scotia Canada. He won by a second round knock out and was signed to a promotional agreement the following week by professional boxing promotional company Three Lions Promotions of Canada. According to Daniel Otter, Managing Director of the promotional outfit, Reda will be progress very well in the professional lightweight division.

World Series of Boxing record

References

External links
 
 
 
 
 Reda Benbaziz at World Series of Boxing

1993 births
Living people
Sportspeople from Béjaïa
Algerian male boxers
Olympic boxers of Algeria
Boxers at the 2016 Summer Olympics
Place of birth missing (living people)
Mediterranean Games gold medalists for Algeria
Mediterranean Games bronze medalists for Algeria
Competitors at the 2013 Mediterranean Games
Competitors at the 2018 Mediterranean Games
African Games gold medalists for Algeria
African Games medalists in boxing
African Games silver medalists for Algeria
Mediterranean Games medalists in boxing
Competitors at the 2011 All-Africa Games
Competitors at the 2015 African Games
Competitors at the 2019 African Games
Bantamweight boxers
21st-century Algerian people